The A4 is a Belgian motorway connecting Brussels and the A6 in Luxembourg. The motorway is part of E411 between Brussels and Arlon.
This motorway, the longest of Belgium (188km), is also nicknamed the "Autoroute de la Nouvelle Belgique" as opposed to the structuring axis Liège-Tournai (crossing an aging industrial zone). Indeed, the A4 connects rapidly developing centers such as Brussels and the city of Luxembourg, and it crosses economic zones full of vitality: the south-eastern suburbs of Brussels, Walloon Brabant and in particular Ottignies-Louvain-la-Neuve, Namur the new capital of Wallonia since 1986, and the country of Arlon.

See also

 Transport in Belgium

References

Motorways in Belgium